Sun protection refers to:

Sunscreen
Sun protective clothing
Car window sun protection glazing